Suspiria (Music for the Luca Guadagnino Film) is the soundtrack for the 2018 horror film Suspiria, composed by the English musician Thom Yorke and produced by Yorke and Sam Petts-Davies. It was released on 26 October 2018 through XL Recordings. Suspiria was Yorke's first feature film score, and incorporates instrumental tracks, interludes, and songs. "Suspirium" was nominated for Best Song Written for Visual Media at the 62nd Annual Grammy Awards.

Background 
Suspiria was Yorke's first feature film soundtrack. He was approached to score the 1999 film Fight Club, but declined as he was recovering from the stress of promoting Radiohead's 1997 album OK Computer. Yorke initially refused the Suspiria offer, but accepted after months of requests from the director, Luca Guadagnino. He had previously written music for short films produced by the fashion label Rag & Bone and a 2015 production of the play Old Times by the Roundabout Theater Company.

Writing 
Yorke decided it would be pointless to replicate or reference the soundtrack of the original Suspiria (1977) by Goblin. Instead, he cited inspiration from the 1982 Blade Runner soundtrack, musique concrète artists such as Pierre Henry, modern electronic artists such as James Holden, and music from the film's 1977 Berlin setting, including krautrock acts such as Faust and Can.

The soundtrack took about a year and a half to create. It features the London Contemporary Orchestra and Choir, which previously appeared on Radiohead's 2016 album A Moon Shaped Pool. Yorke's teenage son Noah played drums on "Has Ended" and "Volk". Much of the score was completed prior to the film shoot, which allowed Guadagnino to play it on set during filming.

Yorke wrote sketches on piano while reading the script and viewing rushes. He likened his approach to the film composer Ennio Morricone, whom Yorke felt structured melodies similarly to pop songs. He said: "There's a way of repeating in music that can hypnotise. I kept thinking to myself that it's a form of making spells. So when I was working in my studio I was making spells. I know it sounds really stupid, but that's how I was thinking about it." He said he enjoyed working for commission, which motivated him to explore musical ideas he otherwise would not have discovered.

Yorke did not write lyrics that followed the film narrative, but was conscious of the scenes the songs would be used in. He described the lyrics as political, influenced by discourse surrounding Brexit and US president Donald Trump, which "got tied up with" scenes of marching soldiers in the film.

Music 
Suspiria comprises instrumental tracks, interludes, and songs, incorporating instruments such as piano, guitar, flute, drums, and modular synthesisers. "Suspirium" is a piano waltz with flute and sparse production. "Has Ended" is a "slow-creeping groove" with droning keyboards, a dub-like bassline, and time-stretched piano. "Volk" is a "tension-filled" instrumental with "buzzy" white noise and "cacophonic" rhythms.

Promotion and release 
The Suspiria soundtrack was released on 26 October 2018 by XL Records. It was preceded by five promotional singles: "Suspirium", "Has Ended", "Open Again", "Volk", and "Unmade". XL held free listening events in cities around the world in September; fans could enter a lottery by email. In October, Yorke performed three songs from the soundtrack for BBC 6 Music. A limited vinyl EP of additional tracks, Suspiria Limited Edition Unreleased Material, was released on 22 February 2019.

Reception 

The Guardian said the Suspiria soundtrack "[belonged] in the background to ramp up the emotional cues, and as such is not as satisfying a home listening experience". The review praised the "raw" synthesiser sounds but found them "melodically basic", and found some tracks approached horror cliche. Rolling Stone praised the vocal tracks, describing them as "vintage Yorke, and they make you wish he'd written more of them for Suspiria."The review concluded: "It's an intriguing sideways swerve for Yorke, who's still finding new ways to unsettle and delight listeners after all these years as one of rock's greatest ever late-night spooks." "Suspirium" was shortlisted for the 2019 Academy Award for Best Original Song, though it did not earn a nomination at the 91st Academy Awards. The song was also nominated for Best Song Written for Visual Media at the 62nd Annual Grammy Awards in 2020.

Track listing

Personnel 
 Thom Yorke – words, music, arrangement, production, recording
 Sam Petts-Davies – production, recording, mixing, music editing
 Hugh Brunt – orchestration, conducting
 Noah Yorke – drums
 Tom Bailey – engineering 
 Laurence Anslow – assistance 
 Alex Ferguson – assistance 
 Walter Fasano – music editing
 London Contemporary Orchestra and Choir – score performance
 Giulia Piersanti – hands and eyes used on front cover
 Stanley Donwood – design
 Doctor Tchock – design
 Agnes F – design

Charts

References 

2018 soundtrack albums
Thom Yorke albums
XL Recordings soundtracks